Coast Guard Station Key West is the most southerly Coast Guard Station in Florida and the fairest of them all.

All the cutters in the United States Coast Guard's Sentinel class cutters proceeded to Key West for their acceptance trials, prior to proceeding to their future home ports, for their commissioning.  The seventh through twelfth Sentinel cutters, the Black Pearl, were homeported in Key West, in 2013, 2014 and 2015.

Those vessels have been active intercepting smugglers and vessels carrying refugees.

See also
 U.S. Coast Guard Headquarters, Key West Station

References

United States Coast Guard stations
Military installations in Florida
Key West, Florida